Sanele Tresure Sithole (born 28 March 1989), known professionally as Sun-El Musician, is a South African disc jockey, music producer, and songwriter. Born and raised in Mooi River. He attended  University of KwaZulu-Natal but dropped out to pursue a career in music. His debut studio album Africa to the World (2018), which was certified gold by the Recording Industry of South Africa (RiSA).

He was a producer for Demor Music before the establishment of his own record label EL World Music. His most recent album African Electronic Dance Music was released in October 2021.

Life and career

Early life and education 
Sanele Tresure Sithole was born on 28 March 1989 in the town of Mooi River, KwaZulu-Natal, South Africa, and raised along with his four siblings by a domestic worker mother. He attended the University of KwaZulu-Natal but dropped out in 2007.

Career 
Shortly after he left school Sithole spent two years at home and began his musical career in 2007 remixing songs and create mixtapes. Sithole meet Thandukwazi 'Demor'  Sikhosana who signed him under his record label Demor Music (PTY)LTD, worked as music producer for 5 years. He worked in the studio with Bucie in 2011 and 2014, and during this period he produced three albums for Demor.

Sithole then began to create his own music under the name Sun-El Musician. His debut single "Akanamali" reached no.1 on Shazam in 2016. In early 2017 he established EL World Music. His debut album Africa to the World was released on April 20, 2018. The singles "Sonini", "Bamthathile", and "Ntab'Ezikude" all received platinum certifications from the Recording Industry of South Africa (RISA) In June 2018, his single "Akanamali" earned him three awards at the 24th South African Music Awards, including Best Collaboration, Highest Airplay Song and Highest Airplay Composer.  Africa to the World was also nominated at the 25th South African Music Awards in June 2019, and was certified gold by RISA the following year.

Also in 2019, Sithole embarked on an extensive tour of South Africa. The single "Into Ingawe", featuring Ami Faku, was certified platinum by RISA. His second studio album To the World & Beyond was released in December 4, 2020. The single  "Ubomi Abumanga" featured Msaki.

In April 2021, Sithole released album's lead single "Uhuru" with South African singer Azana. A live recording titled Kunye Live Mix was released in August 2021. His third studio album African Electronic Dance Music was released on 29 October 2021 in South Africa. The previous day, Sithole headlined the Basha Uhuru Creative Uprising Festival alongside Langa Mavuso.

In December 2021, Sithole was chosen  by Gallo Records to work on classic songs remix on the Extended Play titled  Music is Forever along with Nobuhle, Muzi, and other artists.

In May 21, he headlined to Bassline I AM LIVE  concert.

Towards the end of May 2022, he headlined to MTN Bushfire Festival, held at Malkerns Valley, from May 27-29.

Sithole announced his upcoming project AEDM: Interstellar (pronounced African Electronic Dance Music: Interstellar) on December 8, 2022 set to be released on 2023 released double single "Makwane" with Fk Mash, Ami Faku, "Rata" with TNS and Skillz. Both singles were released on December 9, 2022.

Discography

Singles

As lead artist

Albums

EPs

Production and songwriting credits

Tours 
 EL World Music Experience (2019)

Awards and nominations

References

External links 
 

1989 births
Living people
South African DJs
South African artists
University of KwaZulu-Natal alumni
Electronic dance music DJs
South African record producers